The 1999–2000 North Carolina Tar Heels men's basketball team represented the University of North Carolina from Chapel Hill, North Carolina.

Led by head coach Bill Guthridge, the Tar Heels reached the Final Four of the NCAA tournament. It marked the 15th Final Four appearance in program history, and the second in three years for Coach Guthridge.

Roster

Schedule

|-
!colspan=9 style= | Regular Season

|-
!colspan=9 style= | ACC Tournament
|-

|-
!colspan=9 style= | NCAA Tournament
|-

Rankings

References

North Carolina Tar Heels men's basketball seasons
Tar
Tar
North Carolina
NCAA Division I men's basketball tournament Final Four seasons
North Carolina